The New York City Civil Service Commission (CSC) is the local civil service commission of the NY State Civil Service Commission within the New York City government that hears appeals by city employees and applicants that have been disciplined or disqualified.

See also
 NYS Department of Civil Service
 NYC Department of Citywide Administrative Services (DCAS)

References

External links
 
 Civil Service Commission in the Rules of the City of New York

Civil Service Commission